James William Trimble (February 3, 1894 – March 10, 1972) was a Democratic member of the United States House of Representatives from Arkansas, having served from 1945 to 1967. He was the first Democrat in Arkansas since Reconstruction to lose a congressional race to a Republican. Trimble was unseated in the 1966 general election by state GOP chairman John Paul Hammerschmidt of Harrison in Boone County, who won election on the ticket headed by gubernatorial nominee Winthrop Rockefeller.

Born in tiny Osage in Carroll County in northwestern Arkansas, Trimble attended public schools. He was graduated in 1917 from the University of Arkansas at Fayetteville. He was admitted to the bar in 1925 and commenced practice in Berryville in Carroll County.

During World War I, he served in the United States Army as a private and was assigned to the Adjutant General's Office in Little Rock. From 1920 to 1928, he was a county official of Carroll County. He served as prosecuting attorney of the 4th Judicial Circuit of Arkansas from 1930 to 1938. He served as judge of the 4th Judicial Circuit of Arkansas from 1938 to 1944, when he was elected to the U.S. House.

Trimble was elected as a Democrat to the Seventy-ninth and to the ten succeeding Congresses (January 3, 1945 – January 3, 1967). In the 1944 general election he defeated the Republican Tom Sullins of Fayetteville, 63.3 to 36.7 percent. In 1956, Trimble defeated the Republican William L. Spicer of Fort Smith, later the chairman of the Arkansas Republican Party, by a vote of 61-39 percent. He was a signatory to the 1956 Southern Manifesto that opposed the desegregation of public schools ordered by the Supreme Court in Brown v. Board of Education.

Trimble was the chairman of the Special Committee on Chamber Improvements (Eighty-first and Eighty-second Congresses).
He was an unsuccessful candidate for reelection in 1966 to the Ninetieth Congress.

Trimble resided in Berryville and died in Eureka Springs. He is interred at Berryville Memorial Park in Berryville.

References

1894 births
1972 deaths
United States Army soldiers
United States Army personnel of World War I
People from Berryville, Arkansas
Arkansas lawyers
University of Arkansas alumni
Arkansas state court judges
American segregationists
Democratic Party members of the United States House of Representatives from Arkansas
20th-century American judges
20th-century American politicians
20th-century American lawyers